Callopepla is a genus of moths in the subfamily Arctiinae. The genus was erected by George Hampson in 1898.

Species
 Callopepla emarginata (Walker, 1854)
 Callopepla flammula (Hübner, [1832])
 Callopepla grandis Rothschild, 1912
 Callopepla inachia (Schaus, 1892)

References

External links

Arctiinae